Geraldo Hoogvliets (born 14 June 1992) is a Dutch footballer who played in the Eerste Divisie for FC Volendam and Telstar.

References

Dutch footballers
SC Telstar players
FC Volendam players
People from Hoorn
Eerste Divisie players
1992 births
Living people
Association football fullbacks
Footballers from North Holland